Garsten is a municipality in the district of Steyr-Land in the Austrian state of Upper Austria.

History
Garsten was first mentioned as Garstina in documentation around 990, and a monastery was founded there in 1082. After being fully rebuilt in Baroque style in the late 17th century, the Benedictine monastery was converted to a prison in 1850, a function it fulfills to this day.

References

Cities and towns in Steyr-Land District